A microcyte is an abnormally sized red blood cell.  By definition it is 5 micrometers or smaller in diameter.  It is often associated with several forms of anemia.

References 

Dorland's Illustrated Medical Dictionary, 26th edn. Philadelphia, etc.: W.B. Saunders Co., 1985.
Stedman's Medical Dictionary, 27th edn. Philadelphia, etc.: Lippincott Williams & Wilkins, 2000.

Blood cells